Adrián Jesús Bastía (born 20 December 1978 in Gobernador Crespo, Santa Fe) is a retired Argentine football midfielder.

Career

Bastía started his playing career in 1997 with Racing Club. He was part of the squad that won the 2001 Apertura, Racing Club's first league title in 35 years and their first major title of any description since 1988.

In 2003, Bastía joined Espanyol in Spain but only played eight games for the club before joining FC Saturn in Moscow in 2004, where he was once suspended for eight games.

In 2005 Bastía returned to Argentina, playing for Estudiantes de La Plata before returning to Racing Club in 2006. In 2008, playing for Asteras Tripolis in Greece, Bastía received international fame when, on an away match against Panathinaikos FC, he tackled a pitch invader and received a red card.

In 2011, Bastía returned to Argentina after three years in Greece, joining Colón.
In 2013, he joined Atletico de Rafaela after not being valued by Colón coach Rubén Forestello.

At the end of April 2019, Bastá terminated his contract with Colón and retired.

Honours

Notes

External links
 Guardian statistics

1978 births
Living people
People from San Justo Department, Santa Fe
Argentine footballers
Argentine expatriate footballers
Association football midfielders
Racing Club de Avellaneda footballers
RCD Espanyol footballers
FC Saturn Ramenskoye players
Estudiantes de La Plata footballers
Asteras Tripolis F.C. players
Club Atlético Colón footballers
Atlético de Rafaela footballers
Argentine Primera División players
La Liga players
Russian Premier League players
Super League Greece players
Expatriate footballers in Spain
Expatriate footballers in Greece
Expatriate footballers in Russia
Argentine expatriate sportspeople in Greece
Argentine expatriate sportspeople in Russia
Argentine expatriate sportspeople in Spain
Sportspeople from Santa Fe Province